Imogene is a city in Fremont County, Iowa, United States. The population was 39 at the time of the 2020 census.

Geography
Imogene is located at  (40.878715, -95.427688).

Demographics

2010 census
As of the census of 2010, there were 72 people, 25 households, and 18 families living in the city. The racial makeup of the city was 98.6% White and 1.4% from other races. Hispanic or Latino of any race were 1.4% of the population.

There were 25 households, of which 32.0% had children under the age of 18 living with them, 56.0% were married couples living together, 4.0% had a female householder with no husband present, 12.0% had a male householder with no wife present, and 28.0% were non-families. 20.0% of all households were made up of individuals, and 4% had someone living alone who was 65 years of age or older. The average household size was 2.88 and the average family size was 3.39.

The median age in the city was 44 years. 27.8% of residents were under the age of 18; 5.5% were between the ages of 18 and 24; 18.1% were from 25 to 44; 30.6% were from 45 to 64; and 18.1% were 65 years of age or older. The gender makeup of the city was 54.2% male and 45.8% female.

2000 census
As of the census of 2000, there were 66 people, 29 households, and 16 families living in the city. The racial makeup of the city was 98.48% White, and 1.52% from two or more races.

There were 29 households, out of which 20.7% had children under the age of 18 living with them, 41.4% were married couples living together, 6.9% had a female householder with no husband present, and 44.8% were non-families. 34.5% of all households were made up of individuals, and 20.7% had someone living alone who was 65 years of age or older. The average household size was 2.28 and the average family size was 2.94.

In the city, the population was spread out, with 22.7% under the age of 18, 7.6% from 18 to 24, 33.3% from 25 to 44, 16.7% from 45 to 64, and 19.7% who were 65 years of age or older. The median age was 37 years. For every 100 females, there were 135.7 males. For every 100 females age 18 and over, there were 112.5 males.

The median income for a household in the city was $41,250, and the median income for a family was $46,667. Males had a median income of $24,688 versus $25,625 for females. The per capita income for the city was $25,329. There were no families and 4.2% of the population living below the poverty line, including no under eighteens and none of those over 64.

Education
Imogene is within the Shenandoah Community School District.

Prior to 2016, Farragut was in the Farragut Community School District, which operated Nishnabotna High School. The Farragut district closed in 2016.

References

Cities in Iowa
Cities in Fremont County, Iowa